Blocktrix is a free, online, multiplayer, puzzle game based on TetriNET and was created in 2000 by StrikeLight. It was developed as an update to the official TetriNET 1.13 client after the original creator, St0rmCat, created a new version to the game entitled TetriNET 2, which included major changes to the TetriNET client such as not allowing private servers.  While Blocktrix is compatible with TetriNET servers, the Blocktrix protocol itself adds features to Blocktrix specific servers which makes it a different game altogether.

Features

The Blocktrix program offers various improvements and fixes over the original TetriNET program. Some of these features include, but are not limited to:

Support of Blocktrix, TetriNET, TetriFast, and TSpec modes.
Enhanced key functions including extended key sensitivity, customizable attack keys, rotation of the preview piece (only available in Blocktrix mode), and ability to drop blocks in left-most or right-most columns.
Double-piece preview function (only available in Blocktrix mode).
Enhanced configuration of the partyline including multilingual support, log function, timestamp, and various other features.
Pop-up function on game start and end.
Increased server customization.
Ignore player function.
Bot mode.
Tcl/Tk scripting engine for various event triggers.
Resizable partyline and field windows.
MP3/OGG/MOD/XM/IT/S3M/MIDI music support.
Socks5 support.
Player field zoom-in for small fields.
Recording and playback of games.
Piece shadow (only available in Blocktrix mode).
Three new specials (only available in Blocktrix mode):
 Left Gravity - Similar to gravity, but will leave the right-most column open.
 Piece Change - Changes the current piece.
 Zebra - Clears every second column of the field.

References
 Blocktrix Documentation

External links
 Blocktrix homepage
 The TetriNET Resource

Freeware games
Windows games
Puzzle video games